Studies that are in vivo (Latin for "within the living"; often not italicized in English) are those in which the effects of various biological entities are tested on whole, living organisms or cells, usually  animals, including humans, and plants, as opposed to a tissue extract or dead organism. This is not to be confused with experiments done in vitro ("within the glass"), i.e., in a laboratory environment using test tubes, Petri dishes, etc. Examples of investigations in vivo include: the pathogenesis of disease by comparing the effects of bacterial infection   with the effects of  purified bacterial toxins; the development of non-antibiotics, antiviral drugs, and new drugs generally; and new surgical procedures. Consequently, animal testing and clinical trials are major elements of in vivo research. In vivo testing is often employed over in vitro because it is better suited for observing the overall effects of an experiment on a living subject. In drug discovery, for example, verification of efficacy in vivo is crucial, because in vitro assays can sometimes yield misleading results with drug candidate molecules that are irrelevant in vivo (e.g., because such molecules cannot reach their site of in vivo action, for example as a result of rapid catabolism in the liver).

The English microbiologist Professor Harry Smith and his colleagues in the mid-1950s found that sterile filtrates of serum from animals infected with Bacillus anthracis were lethal for other animals, whereas extracts of culture fluid from the same organism grown in vitro were not. This discovery of anthrax toxin through the use of in vivo experiments had a major impact on studies of the pathogenesis of infectious disease.

The maxim in vivo veritas ("in a living thing [there is] truth") is a play on in vino veritas, ("in wine [there is] truth"), a well-known proverb.

In vivo vs. ex vivo research
In microbiology, in vivo is often used to refer to experimentation done in a whole organism, rather than in live isolated cells, for example, cultured cells derived from biopsies. In this situation, the more specific term is ex vivo. Once cells are disrupted and individual parts are tested or analyzed, this is known as in vitro.

Methods of use
According to Christopher Lipinski and Andrew Hopkins, "Whether the aim is to discover drugs or to gain knowledge of biological systems, the nature and properties of a chemical tool cannot be considered independently of the system it is to be tested in. Compounds that bind to isolated recombinant proteins are one thing; chemical tools that can perturb cell function another; and pharmacological agents that can be tolerated by a live organism and perturb its systems are yet another. If it were simple to ascertain the properties required to develop a lead discovered in vitro to one that is active in vivo, drug discovery would be as reliable as drug manufacturing." Studies on In vivo behavior, determined the formulations of set specific drugs and their habits in a Biorelevant (or Biological relevance) medium.

See also 

Ex vivo
In natura
In ovo
In papyro
In silico
In simulacra
In situ
In utero
In vitro
In vivo imaging
Vivisection

References 

Latin biological phrases
Animal test conditions